Colonel M’bawine Atintande is a Ghanaian military officer and the Director of Public Affairs of the Ghana Armed Forces. He was appointed to the position during the John Kufuor administration and replaced Colonel Nibo.

References

Living people
Ghana Army personnel
Year of birth missing (living people)